The Kankuamo, Kankuaka, Kankui or Kankuané are an indigenous people of Colombia, living on the southern slopes of the Sierra Nevada de Santa Marta up until the north of the César department (corregimientos: Atánquez, Guatapurí, Chemesquemena, Los Haticos, La Mina and Rio Seco). The Kankuamo people, estimated at around 15,000 individuals, speak Sánha, a dialect of the Atanque language of the Chibcha family. Their laws are borne from nature and they consider the Sierra Nevada de Santa Marta, the highest mountain range closest to the sea, as sacred. In their native tongue they call this Umunukunu. Many Kankuamo, mostly merchants, do not speak their native language.



Indigenous group of the Sierra Nevada de Santa Marta 
Traditionally, of the four indigenous groups of the Sierra Nevada de Santa Marta, the Kankuamo people are the least contacted by others, having developed strategies to survive away from the outside world.

The Kankuamo people are characterized for their different way of dressing from the other peoples of the Sierra Nevada; the women wear two overlapping cloths, and the men wear short trousers and a hat of reed. Their living space is bordered by the Kogui, Wiwa and Arhuaco.

From the late 1980s to 2006 over 300 Kankuamo people were murdered during the Colombian conflict.

Economy 

The economy of the Kankuamo is based on agriculture. The main products are yuca, ñame, pigeon peas, corn, bananas, coca leaves, fique, arracacha and starch.

References

External links 
  Website of the Kankuamo people

Indigenous peoples in Colombia
Cesar Department
Sierra Nevada de Santa Marta